The 1915 Fordham Maroon football team was an American football team that represented Fordham University as an independent during the 1915 college football season. Fordham claims a 19–6 record. College Football Data Warehouse (CFDW) lists the team's record at 4–4. 

Harry Vaughan was the coach, and David Dunn was the captain. The team played its home games at Fordham Field in The Bronx.

Schedule
The following eight games are reported in Fordham's media guide, CFDW and contemporaneous press coverage.

The following are additional games reported in the Fordham media guide.

References

Fordham
Fordham Rams football seasons
Fordham Maroon football